The 2019 Philippines Football League was the third season of the Philippines Football League (PFL), the professional football league of the Philippines. Ceres–Negros are the defending champions. This marks the revival of the Philippines Football League as the league folded after the 2018 season to give way for the Philippine Premier League, intended as a successor league to the PFL, which proved to be short-lived.

The 2019 season started on May 25, 2019, and ended on October 19, 2019.

Ceres–Negros won their second title on October 12, 2019, by winning over Green Archers United 3–1 with two matches to spare. On October 19, 2019, Ceres beat rivals Kaya–Iloilo 3–0 to complete the first 3-peat in PFL History and by doing so got their 22nd PFL victory, leading them to the first invincibles this season.

Teams
Seven teams participated in the 2019 season, including three debutants, Green Archers, Mendiola, and Philippine Air Force.

Personnel and kits

Foreign players
A maximum of four foreigners are allowed per club which follows the Asian Football Confederation's (AFC) '3+1 rule'; three players of any nationality and a fourth coming from an AFC member nation.

Players name in bold indicates the player was registered during the mid-season transfer window.

Notes
1. Former players only include players who left after either the start of the 2019 season or the 2019 Copa Paulino Alcantara.

League table

Positions by round

Results by round

Results 
The seven clubs will play each other in two rounds of home and away matches. 84 league matches will be played in total.

First round

Second round

Season statistics

Scoring

Top goalscorers

Top assists

Own goals

Hat-tricks

Note
(H) – Home ; (A) – Away 

4 Player scored four goals

Clean sheets

Discipline

Red cards

Awards 
The following awards were given at the conclusion of the tournament.

Notes

References

2019 in Asian association football leagues
Philippines
Philippines Football League seasons